Gannett Co., Inc. is an American mass media holding company headquartered in Tysons, Virginia, in the Washington, D.C., metropolitan area. It is the largest U.S. newspaper publisher as measured by total daily circulation. 

It owns the national newspaper USA Today, as well as several local newspapers, including the Detroit Free Press; The Indianapolis Star; The Cincinnati Enquirer; The Florida Times-Union in Jacksonville, Florida; The Tennessean in Nashville, Tennessee; The Daily News Journal, in Murfreesboro, Tennessee; The Courier-Journal in Louisville, Kentucky; the Democrat and Chronicle in Rochester, New York; The Des Moines Register; the El Paso Times; The Arizona Republic in Phoenix, Arizona; The News-Press in Fort Myers, Florida; the Milwaukee Journal Sentinel; and the Great Falls Tribune in Great Falls, Montana. 
 
In 2015, Gannett split into two publicly traded companies, one focusing on newspapers and publishing and the other on broadcasting. The broadcasting company took the name Tegna, and owns about 50 TV stations. The newspaper company inherited the Gannett name. The split was structured so that Tegna is the legal successor of the old Gannett, while the new Gannett is a spin-off.

In November 2019, New Media Investment Group acquired and merged its GateHouse Media subsidiary into Gannett, creating the largest newspaper publisher in the United States, which adopted the Gannett name. Mike Reed was named CEO.

History

1906–1983

Gannett Company, Inc., was formed in 1923 by Frank Gannett in Rochester, New York, as an outgrowth of the Elmira Gazette, a newspaper business he had begun in Elmira, New York, in 1906. Gannett, who was known as a conservative, gained fame and fortune by purchasing small independent newspapers and developing them into a large chain, a 20th-century trend that helped the newspaper industry remain financially viable. By 1979, the chain had grown to 79 newspapers.

In April 1957, Paul Miller succeeded Frank Gannett as president and CEO. In 1973, Miller was succeeded by Al Neuharth.

In 1979, Gannett acquired Combined Communications Corp., operator of 2 major daily newspapers, the Oakland Tribune and The Cincinnati Enquirer, seven television stations, 13 radio stations, as well as an outdoor advertising division, for $370 million. The outdoor advertising became known as Gannett Outdoor, before being acquired by Outdoor Systems (previously a division of 3M), before the company was sold to Infinity Broadcasting, which later became part of Viacom, and was part of CBS Corporation, until 2014 when CBS Outdoor went independent and became Outfront Media.

Gannett's oldest newspaper is the Berrow's Worcester Journal based in Worcester, England and founded in 1690. In the United States the oldest newspapers still in circulation are the Poughkeepsie Journal, founded in Poughkeepsie, New York in 1785, and The Leaf-Chronicle founded in Clarksville, Tennessee in 1808.

1984–2013
In 1984, John Curley was appointed president and COO. In 1985, Curley became CEO and continued as president.

The company was headquartered in Rochester until 1986, when it moved to Arlington County, Virginia. Its former headquarters building, the Gannett Building, was listed on the National Register of Historic Places in 1985.

Douglas H. McCorkindale succeeded Curley as CEO in 2000 and chairman in 2001. That year, the company moved to its current headquarters in Tysons Corner, Virginia, a suburb of Washington, D.C.

Beginning in 2005 at the Fort Myers News-Press, Gannett pioneered the mojo concept of mobile multimedia journalists, reporters who were initially untethered from conventional newsrooms and drove around their communities filing hyperlocal news in various formats including text for print publication, still photos for print and online publication, and audio and video for the News-Press website. The practice has spread throughout the chain.

In 2010, Gannett increased executive salaries and bonuses; for example, Bob Dickey, Gannett's U.S. newspapers division president, was paid $3.4 million in 2010, up from $1.9 million the previous year. The next year, the company laid off 700 U.S. employees to cut costs. In the memo announcing the layoffs, Dickey wrote, "While we have sought many ways to reduce costs, I regret to tell you that we will not be able to avoid layoffs."

On March 7, 2011, Gannett replaced the stylized "G" logo in use since the 1970s (notably used on its TV stations as a corporate/local ID with different animations), and adopted a new company tagline: "It's all within reach."

In February 2012, Gannett announced that it would implement a paywall system across all of its daily newspaper websites, with non-subscriber access limited to between five and fifteen articles per month, varying by newspaper. The USA Today website became the only one to allow unrestricted access.

On March 24, 2012, the company announced that it would discipline 25 employees in Wisconsin who had signed the petition to recall Governor Scott Walker, stating that this open public participation in a political process was a violation of the company's code of journalistic ethics and that their primary responsibility as journalists was to maintain credibility and public trust in themselves and the organization.

On August 21, 2012, Gannett acquired Blinq Media.

Around the first week of October 2012, Gannett entered a dispute against Dish Network regarding compensation fees and Dish's AutoHop commercial-skip feature on its Hopper digital video recorders. Gannett ordered that Dish discontinue AutoHop on the account that it is affecting advertising revenues for Gannett's television station. Gannett threatened to pull all of its stations should the skirmish continue beyond October 7, and Dish and Gannett fail to reach an agreement. The two parties eventually reached an agreement after extending the deadline for a few hours.

Acquisition of Belo Corporation
On June 13, 2013, Gannett announced plans to buy Dallas-based Belo Corporation for $1.5 billion and the assumption of debt. The purchase would add 20 additional stations to Gannett's portfolio and make the company the fourth largest television broadcaster in the U.S. with 43 stations. Because of ownership conflicts that exist in markets where both Belo and Gannett own television stations and newspapers, the use of a third-party company (Sander Media, LLC, owned by former Belo executive Jack Sander) as a licensee to buy stations to be operated by the owner of a same-market competitor and concerns about any possible future consolidation of operations of Gannett- and Belo-owned properties in markets where both own television stations or collusion involving the Gannett and Sander stations in retransmission consent negotiations, anti-media-consolidation groups (such as Free Press) and pay television providers (such as Time Warner Cable and DirecTV) have called for the FCC to block the acquisition.

On December 16, 2013, the United States Department of Justice announced that Gannett, Belo, and Sander would need to divest Belo's station in St. Louis, KMOV, to a government-approved third-party that would be barred from entering into any agreements with Gannett, in order to fully preserve competition in advertising sales with Gannett-owned KSDK. The deal was approved by the FCC on December 20, and it was completed on December 23.  On February 28, 2014, Meredith Corporation officially took over full control of KMOV.

Acquisition of London Broadcasting Company stations
On May 14, 2014, Gannett announced the acquisition of six stations from the Texas-based London Broadcasting Company in a $215 million deal, including KCEN-TV (NBC) in Waco-Temple-Bryan, KYTX (CBS) in Tyler-Longview, KIII (ABC) in Corpus Christi, KBMT (ABC/NBC) in Beaumont-Port Arthur, KXVA (FOX) in Abilene-Sweetwater and KIDY (FOX) in San Angelo. The company's COO Phil Hurley will also join Gannett to continue his leadership role at the six stations. The acquisition was completed on July 8, 2014; in total, Gannett stations now serve 83% of households in the state. Post acquisition, Gannett now outright owns and operates their first Fox affiliates, KIDY & KXVA.

Split and further deals
On August 5, 2014, Gannett announced that it plans to split into two independent publicly traded companies–one focused on newspapers and publishing, the other on broadcasting. Robert Dickey, head of old Gannett's newspaper division, became CEO of the newspaper company, leaving Gannett's remaining broadcasting and digital operations under the leadership of Martore. In a statement, she explained that the split plans were "significant next steps in our ongoing initiatives to increase shareholder value by building scale, increasing cash flow, sharpening management focus, and strengthening all of our businesses to compete effectively in today's increasingly digital landscape." Additionally, the company announced that it would buy out the remainder of Classified Ventures—a joint venture between Gannett and several other media companies, for $1.8 billion, giving it full ownership of properties such as Cars.com. On April 21, 2015, Gannett announced that the publishing arm would continue to use the Gannett name, while the broadcasting and digital company would be named Tegna—an anagram of Gannett. The split was completed on June 29, 2015. The split was structured so that the old Gannett changed its name to Tegna, and then spun off its publishing interests as a "new" Gannett Company. Tegna retained "old" Gannett's stock price history under a new ticker symbol, TGNA, while "new" Gannett inherited "old" Gannett's ticker symbol, GCI.

The two companies shared a headquarters complex in Tysons Corner for a time, though Tegna has since moved to a new 440,000-square-foot office tower nearby, occupying roughly 60,000 square feet.

On October 7, 2015, Gannett struck a deal to buy the Journal Media Group for $280 million, giving it control of publications in over 100 markets in the Midwestern and Southern U.S. Similar to what Gannett had earlier done with its broadcasting assets, the Milwaukee-based Journal had separated its publishing and broadcasting arms in April 2015, with the E. W. Scripps Company acquiring the television and radio properties owned by the former's technical predecessor Journal Communications and spinning out their respective publishing operations into Journal Media Group. In December 2015, Gannett announced that its local newspapers would be branded as the "USA Today Network", signifying a closer association with the national USA Today paper.

In April 2016, Gannett made an unsolicited bid to acquire the Tribune Publishing Company for $12.25 per-share, or around $400 million. This deal was rejected by Tribune's shareholders in May 2016; in turn, Gannett increased its offer to around $15 per-share (around $800 million). Although the two companies held talks during the summer and into the fall of 2016, disappointing earning reports for Gannett for the second and third quarters of 2016 caused Gannett to pull out of talks on November 1.

Gannett announced it would not be delaying print deadlines for the 2018 midterm elections in the United States, meaning that next-day newspapers would no longer contain the election's results, instead directing readers to the Internet.

Sale to GateHouse Media and relationship with Softbank 
In January 2019, Digital First Media made an unsolicited bid to acquire Gannett for $1.36 billion, but it was rejected for being undervalued. In an attempt to pursue a hostile takeover, DFM built up a 7.5% stake of Gannett's public shares. Gannett subsequently accused the company of engaging in a proxy fight. After a failed attempt to place 3 DFM nominees on Gannett's board of directors through a proxy vote on May 16, 2019, DFM sold shares lowering their ownership to 4.2%.

On August 5, 2019, New Media Investment Group, parent of GateHouse Media, announced that it would acquire Gannett.  New Media Investment Group is managed and controlled by another private equity firm, Fortress Investment Group. Fortress is owned by the Japanese conglomerate Softbank.

Apollo Global Management funded the acquisition with a $1.792 billion loan. The combined company assumed the Gannett name rather than GateHouse name, and Michael E. Reed, the CEO of GateHouse's parent company, was named CEO. The new management team immediately announced it would target "inefficiencies," which could lead to cutbacks at newspapers and reduction in newspaper staff.

Sued for enabling sexual abuse of paperboys in New York and Arizona 
Gannett was sued in October 2019 under the New York State Child Victim's Act by a former paperboy who accused the company of enabling a former district manager to sexually abuse him in the 1980s. In late 2018 as Gannett was seeking partners for a merger, fending off a hostile takeover and its stock fell, this former paperboy emailed investigative reporters and Gannett management asking them to investigate his claims. In response, Karen Magnuson, then Executive Editor for Gannett's Democrat & Chronicle, told reporters to put their investigative reporting of abuse claims on "pause", and brought the email to the attention of Gannett's management to conduct their own investigation. Gannett COO Michael G. Kane then sent the original claimant a letter indicating no evidence had been found and they were "closing out" the matter. A few months later New York passed its Child Victim Act lifting statute of limitations on child sex abuse claims. This initial case is currently pending. Four more lawsuits were filed in February 2020 and are pending. Additionally, three more men filed suit against Gannett for child sex abuse in September 2020 and April 2021, these cases are all pending too. In December 2020, Gannett and its Arizona Republic newspaper were also sued by two former paperboys in the Phoenix, AZ community for enabling its employees to sexually abuse them in the late 1970s. As the New York state window to file under its Childs Victim Act closed in August 2021, another man sued Gannett in Rochester NY alleging child sex abuse by the same former district manager of paper boys. This latest case brings the total to eleven men who are suing Gannett for enabling sexual abuse of former paperboys, some as young as eleven at the time. Nearly three years after the first lawsuit filing, in July 2022, Gannett defense attorneys notified the court of their intent to file a motion to have the former paperboy's Child Victims Act cases taken "out of the state court system and turn them over to the New York Workers’ Compensation Board"  stating that the 11-14 year old paperboys should have applied for workman's compensation at the time of their injuries in the 1980s as it is a "simple online process".

Gannett and COVID-19 
In March 2020, Gannett announced that due to COVID-19, it will be forced to make a series of cuts and furloughs. Executives will also take a 25% reduction in salary.

Reduction of editorial content

In April 2022, a committee of Gannett editors made the formal recommendation that newspapers in the chain should significantly pare back the opinion material that newspapers traditionally publish on their editorial pages, including editorials, op-ed columns, syndicated columns and editorial cartoons. According to the company-wide memo, "Readers don’t want us to tell them what to think. They don’t believe we have the expertise to tell anyone what to think on most issues. They perceive us as having a biased agenda.” The memo additionally claimed that editorial content is the least-read content in the papers while being the most likely reason someone gives for cancelling a subscription.

Financial conditions and layoffs 2022

In the second quarter of 2022, Gannett's revenue was $749 million, sustaining a loss of $54 million. In reaction to the news, the company announced, "In the coming days, we will be making necessary but painful reductions to staffing, eliminating some open positions and roles that will impact valued colleagues."
 At the end of August, the company announced that it was laying off 3% of its United States workforce, which was about 400 employees. At this announcement, Gannett also said they would not be filling 400 open positions.

At the time of the announcement, Gannett stock—which was already down about 45% on the year—fell an additional 28.5%.

In October, the company announced the second round of financial austerity steps. These included the requirement that all employees take a week of unpaid leave in December, and a suspension of matching contributions to employee 401(k) accounts. Gannett also instituted a hiring freeze and is seeking volunteers for buyouts.

Gannett announced around 200 more layoffs, or six percent of the news division, in November.

As part of the cuts, Gannett stopped printing six community papers, collectively known as the Observer and Eccentric chain, in southeast Michigan. This cut included the print editions of the Livonia Observer as well as papers covering Westland, Farmington, Plymouth, Canton, and Birmingham.  Gannett indicated that the publications would provide online content.

Acquisitions

List of Gannett Co. assets

Gannett's media properties include the following newspapers among the top 100 by circulation in the United States:

Print media

Significant digital investments
 Digg sold to BuySellAds in April 2018
 WordStream (Digital Marketing Company) 
 LocaliQ (Marketing Platform)

Directors and senior executives
Gannett has an eight-member board of directors and 11 senior executives.

On October 6, 2011, Gannett's chairman, president and Chief executive officer Craig A. Dubow resigned, citing health reasons. He was succeeded by Gracia Martore, Gannett's Chief operating officer, a 26-year company veteran.

In May 2019, Barbara Wall was appointed as interim chief executive officer after Bob Dickey retired.

Mike Reed became Gannett's Chief Executive Officer in June 2020. His immediate predecessor,
Paul Bascobert, served in the role for about ten months, starting in August 2019.

References

External links
 
 

 
Holding companies of the United States
Mass media companies of the United States
Newspaper companies of the United States
Companies based in McLean, Virginia
Publishing companies established in 1906
Companies listed on the New York Stock Exchange
Pulitzer Prize for Public Service winners
Pulitzer Prize for National Reporting winners
American companies established in 1906